Khalil Kola (also Romanized as Khalīl Kolā and Khalīl Kalā; also known as Khalīl Kūlā) is a village in Karipey Rural District, Lalehabad District, Babol County, Mazandaran Province, Iran. At the 2006 census, its population was 559, in 154 families.

References 

Populated places in Babol County